2019 Ukrainian Athletics Championships among the athletes of the senior age category was held from 21 to 23 August in Lutsk at  Avanhard Stadium.

Throughout the year, a number of standalone national championships in different events not contested in Lutsk were held among the athletes of the senior age category.

Championships geography 
In total, 15 cities and villages from 11 oblasts of Ukraine will host the senior national championships in athletics:
 Lutsk — main championships (21-23 August)
 Mukachevo — winter throwing (15-17 February) and mountain running (uphill-downhill) (9 June)
 Volovets — mountain running (uphill) (2 June) 
 Uzhhorod — relays (18-19 May) and cross country running (30-31 October)
 Melitopol — 10,000 metres (25 May)
 Ivano-Frankivsk — winter race walk (23-24 March) and 50 km race walk (19-20 жовтня), both on road
 Vyzhnytsia — trail running (6-7 April)
 Chernivtsi — one mile road run (29 September)
 Vinnytsia — 48-hour run (28-30 June)
 Sumy — 20 km road race walk (16 June)
 Skole — long distance mountain running (16 June)
 Lviv — 10 km road run (15 September)
 Poltava — half marathon (1 September)
 Kyiv — 12-hour and 24-hour run (21-22 September)
 Bila Tserkva — marathon (6 October)

Medalists

Men

Women

Other championships

Stadium events 

 2019 Ukrainian Winter Throwing Championships was held on 15-17 February in Mukachevo. Athletes contested in three throwing events (discus throw, hammer throw and javelin throw). It was the key competition for selection of the national team for the European Throwing Cup.
 2019 Ukrainian Relays Championships was held on 18-19 May in Uzhhorod at Avanhard Stadium.
 2019 Ukrainian 10,000 Metres Championships was held on 25 May in Melitopol at Spartak Stadium. The national team for the 2019 European 10,000m Cup was selected at the competition.

Men

Women

Mixed

Road race walk 

 2019 Ukrainian Winter Race Walking Championships was held on 23-24 March in Ivano-Frankivsk. It was the key competition for selection of the national team for the European Race Walking Cup.
 2019 Ukrainian 20 Kilometres Race Walk Championships was held on 16 June in Sumy.
 2019 Ukrainian 50 Kilometres Race Walk Championships was held on 19 October in Ivano-Frankivsk.

Men

Women

Trail, mountain and cross country running 

 2019 Ukrainian Trail Running Championships was held on 6 April in Vyzhnytsia. The running distance was 54.5 km long with 3,250 m elevation gain.
 2019 Ukrainian Mountain Running Championships (uphill) was held on 2 June in Volovets. The running distance was 12 km long with 1,200 m elevation gain.
 2019 Ukrainian Mountain Running Championships (uphill-downhill) was held on 9 June in Mukachevo. The running distance was 12 km (with height difference of 650 m) for men and 8 km (with height difference of 400 m) for women. The winners secured the right to participate in European and world mountain running championships.
 2019 Ukrainian Mountain Running Championships (long distance) was held on 16 June in Skole as a part of the annual 'Skole Ultra Trail' mountain running competition. The running distance was 52.6 km long with height difference of 2,300 m.
 2019 Ukrainian Cross Country Running Championships was held on 30-31 October in Uzhhorod.

Men

Women

Road running 
 2019 Ukrainian One Mile Run Championships was held on 29 September in Chernivtsi.
 2019 Ukrainian 10 Kilometres Run Championships was held on 15 September in Lviv.
 2019 Ukrainian Half Marathon Championships was held on 1 September in Poltava.
 2019 Ukrainian Marathon Championships was held on 6 October in Bila Tserkva.
 2019 Ukrainian 12-Hour and 24-Hour Run Championships was held on 21-22 September in Kyiv.
 2019 Ukrainian 48-Hour Run Championships was held on 28-30 June in Vinnytsia.

Men

Women

See also 

 2019 Ukrainian Athletics Indoor Championships

References

External links 

 2019 Ukrainian Athletics Championships' results  on the Ukrainian Athletic Federation's web-site
 2019 Ukrainian Winter Throwing Championships' results  on the Ukrainian Athletic Federation's web-site
 2019 Ukrainian Winter Race Walking Championships' results  on the Ukrainian Athletic Federation's web-site
 2019 Ukrainian Trail Running Championships' results on the Ukrainian Athletic Federation's web-site
 2019 Ukrainian Relays Championships' results  on the Ukrainian Athletic Federation's web-site
 2019 Ukrainian 10,000 Metres Championships' results  on the Ukrainian Athletic Federation's web-site
 2019 Ukrainian Mountain Running (Uphill) Championships' results on the Ukrainian Athletic Federation's web-site
 2019 Ukrainian Mountain Running (Uphill-Downhill) Championships' results on the Ukrainian Athletic Federation's web-site
 2019 Ukrainian 20 Kilometres Race Walk Championships' results  on the Ukrainian Athletic Federation's web-site
 2019 Ukrainian Mountain Running (Long Distance) Championships' results on the Ukrainian Athletic Federation's web-site
 2019 Ukrainian 48-Hour Run Championships' results  on the Ukrainian Athletic Federation's web-site
 2019 Ukrainian Half Marathon Championships' results on the Ukrainian Athletic Federation's web-site
 2019 Ukrainian 10 km Championships' results on the Ukrainian Athletic Federation's web-site
 2019 Ukrainian 12-Hour and 24-Hour Run Championships' results  on the Ukrainian Athletic Federation's web-site
 2019 Ukrainian 1 Mile Run Championships' results  on the Ukrainian Athletic Federation's web-site
 2019 Ukrainian Marathon Championships' results  on the Ukrainian Athletic Federation's web-site
 2019 Ukrainian Cross Country Championships' results  on the Ukrainian Athletic Federation's web-site

Ukrainian Athletics Championships
Ukrainian Athletics Championships
Ukrainian Athletics Championships
Sport in Kropyvnytskyi
Sport in Mukachevo
Sport in Ivano-Frankivsk
Sport in Vyzhnytsia
Sport in Vinnytsia
Sport in Melitopol
Sport in Sumy
Sport in Skole
Sport in Poltava
Sport in Lviv
Sports competitions in Kyiv
Sport in Chernivtsi
Sport in Bila Tserkva
Sport in Uzhhorod
Sport in Zakarpattia Oblast